Artigas Department is the northernmost department of Uruguay, located in its northwestern region. Its capital is the city of Artigas, which borders on the Brazilian city of Quaraí. The population is 73,378 inhabitants, according to the 2011 census.

It is bordered on the north and east by Brazil, from which it is separated by the Cuareim River. To the south, Artigas Department borders on Salto Department, and to the west is Argentina, from which it is separated by the Uruguay River. Artigas is the only Uruguayan department that borders two other countries.

The department and its capital city are named after José Gervasio Artigas (1764–1850), leader of the Orientales (inhabitants of the Banda Oriental, the Eastern bank of the Uruguay River) during Uruguay's wars of independence.

History

Owner region of a prehistoric past which later became "no man's land" between the Spanish and Portuguese empires. The initial indigenous predominance (chanás-charrúas-Guarani) was displaced by the native settlement and subsequent colonies of immigrants.

Artigas department was created by law on 1 October 1884, on territory previously belonged to the department of Salto; from that date it is designated to Villa de San Eugenio as capital, which in 1915 passed to the category of city with the name of Artigas, capital of the department with the same name in tribute to the national hero of Uruguay José Gervasio Artigas. He was linked to the fact Colonel Carlos Lecueder, first politician and police chief Artigas.

Its capital Artigas comes at the end of the "Guerra Grande" in order to consolidate the borders with Brazil, with the name of San Eugenio del Cuareim. It was founded on September 12, 1852 by Don Carlos Catala, choosing as the best site located on the banks of the Cuareim River opposite the Villa San Juan Bautista on the other side of the river, which was a military settlement that was then transformed into what is today the city of Quaraí.

With the name of Santa Rosa del Cuareim was founded the current Bella Unión by Fructuoso Rivera and refugees Guarani after the campaign Eastern Missions against Brazil in 1829. In 1852 after winning the allies Colorados Brazil national, territory north of Cuareim was yielded to Brazil which prompted an evacuation of the population. It was refounded in 1853 under the name of Santa Rosa de la Bella Unión Quareim. In 1929 the national government to mark the centenary of the campaign of Missions, sent a bill to the Senate, which established the name Bella Unión, which for that time was a villa .

Geography

Two portions of the department's border with Brazil are disputed (Isla Brasilera or Brazilian Island near Bella Unión, and an area called Rincón de Artigas near Masoller), but unlike many border disputes between Latin American countries, this issue has not strained Uruguay's relations with Brazil, which remain friendly.

Two main geostructural regions can be found inside Artigas' limits:
The central and eastern area, which includes a basaltic cuesta, and some sedimentary plains near the Cuareim River. Also found in the region are some hill ranges, such as Cuchilla de Belén.
The western area, which consists of a narrow alluvial plain.

Artigas Department's average temperature is the highest in the whole country (over 19 °C or 66 °F, and may go as high as 47 °C or 116 °F during the summer months). So are its precipitation levels (up to an annual average of 1400 mm).

Economy

The unique climatic conditions of Artigas has made possible the development of an important agro-industrial centre around the city of Bella Unión. Several crops are planted, namely fruits and vegetables, sugar cane, and rice. In the rest of the department, the main economic activity is livestock raising.

Semi-precious gemstones, such as agates and amethysts, are also found in the department, and an entire industry has risen up around their extraction and manufacturing, especially near the capital city of Artigas.

The proximity of the department to Brazil has made it possible for an important flow of trade to be established here, but unfortunately this is generally unfavorable to Uruguayan economic interests. Nevertheless, this partially compensates for the fact that the per capita income is the lowest of the country, and the percentage of households in poverty is the highest in the country (13.19% of the inhabitants).

Demographics

 
As of the census of 2011, the Artigas Department had a population of 73,378 (36,079 male and 37,299 female) and 26,231 households.

Demographic data for Artigas Department in 2010:
Population growth rate: -0,006%
Birth Rate: 15.48 births/1,000 people
Death Rate: 7.05 deaths/1,000 people
Average age: 28.2 (27.2 male, 29.2 female)
Life Expectancy at Birth:
Total population: 75.43 years
Male; 72.03 years
Female: 79.35 years
Average per household income: 19,273 pesos/month
Urban per capita income: 6,994 pesos/month
2010 Data Source:

Rural population
According to the 2011 census, Artigas department has a rural population of 3,524.

See also
 List of populated places in Uruguay#Artigas Department
 Uruguayan-Brazilian border dispute
  Highly detailed map of Artigas Department (2405×1949px)showing all populated places and full geographic details.See full size version in Commons.

Bibliography

References

External links

INE map of Artigas Department
Nuestra Terra, Colección Los Departamentos, Vol.17 "Artigas"

 
Departments of Uruguay
States and territories established in 1884
1884 establishments in Uruguay